Tamacine (sometimes written Témacine) is a town and commune, and capital of Témacine District, in Touggourt Province, Algeria. According to the 2008 census it has a population of 20,067, up from 15,933 in 1998, and an annual growth rate of 2.4%. The Tugurt language is spoken by some residents of Tamacine.

History
The mosque in the town of Témacine, the Mosque of Si al-Hajj, dates to 1431.

Geography

Tamacine lies at an elevation of  within the system of oases near Touggourt. These oases feature extensive palm groves and other agriculture. Beyond this is the arid and barren landscape of the Sahara, featuring areas of sand dunes (ergs) and flat rocky plains (regs).

Climate

Tamacine, like other towns in the Saharan region, has a hot desert climate with very hot summers and mild winters, and very little precipitation.

Economy
The most significant sector in Tamacine's economy is agriculture, in particular the farming of date palms; over 200,000 palms are planted across the commune. Other fruit trees are also cultivated, including olives, figs, apricots, pomegranates, apples, grapes and plums. Livestock reared in the commune are mainly goats and sheep.

Tamacine also has various traditional industries, such as pottery, jewellery, textile industries including embroidery and knitting, and blacksmithing.

Tourism is another important industry for Tamacine. The most notable attractions include Lake Tamacine, as well as the various mosques and palaces in the town.

Infrastructure
Drinking water is available to 99% of the population, and access to the sewerage network is available to 95%.

Health
Tamacine has two municipal health clinics, a private health clinic, and several pharmacies.

Education
Tamacine's educational facilities include 8 municipal elementary schools, a vocational training center, apprenticeships, and an educational center for mentally handicapped children. 8.3% of the population has a tertiary education, and another 20.9% has completed secondary education. The overall literacy rate is 83.4%, and is 88.5% among males and 78.5% among females.

Transportation

Tamacine is connected by local roads to Touggourt to the north and the N3 national highway to the west. From Touggourt, major highways lead north to Biskra, east to El Oued, and south to Ouargla and Illizi. The town is served by the Sidi Madhi Airport near Touggourt.

Localities
The commune is composed of five localities:

Temacine
El Behour
Sidi Ameur
El Ksour
Tamellaht

References

External links

Neighbouring towns and cities

Communes of Ouargla Province
Cities in Algeria
Algeria